David Dobkin may refer to:

 David P. Dobkin (born 1948), computer scientist and the Dean of the Faculty at Princeton University
 David Dobkin (director) (born ca. 1969), movie director, responsible for Clay Pigeons, Shanghai Knights, and Wedding Crashers